Sons of Garmadon is the eighth season of the computer-animated television series Ninjago: Masters of Spinjitzu (titled Ninjago from the eleventh season onward). The series was created by Michael Hegner and Tommy Andreasen. The season aired from 16 April to 25 May 2018, following the seventh season titled Hands of Time. It is succeeded by the ninth season titled Hunted.

The eighth season was the first season to be produced following the release of the 2017 film The Lego Ninjago Movie, which had significant impact on its development. The season adopted the new character designs from the movie, including face and hair alterations for the main ninja characters that differed significantly from the previous seasons. This was a particularly controversial move for existing fans of the show. The central character Lloyd Garmadon was given a new voice actor Sam Vincent, replacing Jillian Michaels.

The season introduces the character Princess Harumi as the season's main antagonist, who is revealed to be the leader of a criminal biker gang called the Sons of Garmadon. The storyline follows Harumi's plan to steal three Oni masks in order to resurrect Lord Garmadon in a purely evil form. The season also resolves a cliffhanger that occurs at the end of the previous season titled Hands of Time, in which the main character Master Wu is seemingly lost in the time vortex. The eighth season sees the return of the character, who has been aged backwards to appear as a baby. The season ends with the return of Lord Garmadon and the defeat of the ninja, resulting in a cliffhanger that is resolved in the subsequent season.

Voice cast

Main 

 Sam Vincent as Lloyd Garmadon, the Green Ninja
 Vincent Tong as Kai, the red ninja and Elemental Master of Fire
 Michael Adamthwaite as Jay, the blue ninja and Elemental Master of Lightning
 Brent Miller as Zane, the white ninja and Elemental Master of Ice
 Kirby Morrow as Cole, the black ninja and Elemental Master of Earth
 Kelly Metzger as Nya, the Elemental Master of Water and Kai's sister
Britt McKillip as Princess Harumi

Supporting 

 Mark Oliver as Lord Garmadon
 Jennifer Hayward as P.I.X.A.L. a female nindroid
 Paul Dobson as Sensei Wu, the wise teacher of the ninja
Caleb Skeris as Wu (baby)
 Kathleen Barr as Misako
 Alan Marriott as Dareth
Tabitha St. Germain as Mystake
Michael Donovan as Samurai X
 Garry Chalk as Killow
 Maggie Blue O'Hara as Ultra Violet
 Ellen Kennedy as the Empress
 Richard Newman as the Emperor
 Alan Marriott as Hutchins/The Mechanic
 Brent Miller as Mr. E
Michael Adamthwaite as Luke Cunningham
Michael Donovan as Police Commissioner
Kelly Sheridan as Gayle Gossip

Production

Character design 
Sons of Garmadon was the first season to be produced following the release of the 2017 film The Lego Ninjago Movie, which was the third film in The Lego Movie franchise. The season title and opening scene were revealed at San Diego Comic-Con 2017. The eighth season adopted new designs for the main ninja characters that had appeared in the movie, including new hair and face designs. This was a particularly controversial change with existing fans of the show. As a result of the controversy, co-creator Tommy Andreasen released a statement on Twitter confirming that the eighth season was a continuation of the preceding storyline and stating, "Several characters like Zane and Cole have had major updates during the series' long run. Usually these changes happen within the episodes. This time however since time has passed since the end of Hands of Time, the changes are simply there. Where it may raise questions as you first encounter it, most of these changes will be touched upon in the episodes. The most notable change you have already seen on Lloyd. The other Ninja, though they may have some adjustments, will be using the original face rigs from the series and be voiced by the original voice cast, so rest assured that these are in fact the characters you know and love." Sons of Garmadon was also the first season in the series in which the character Lloyd Garmadon was voiced by Sam Vincent, replacing Jillian Michaels as voice actor.

Animation 
The animation for the season continued at Wil Film ApS in Denmark. For the eighth season Wil Film made changes to their production pipeline to make visual improvements to the show.

Direction 
Peter Hauser was the season director, with Louise Barkholt as producer.

Writing 
The season was written by Dan and Kevin Hageman, who were also the season's executive producers and the original writers from the beginning of the show.

Music 
The season was scored by Jay Vincent and Michael Kramer.

Release 
The first trailer for the season was released on 5 January 2018 on the Lego YouTube channel. The season premiered on Cartoon Network on 16 April 2018 with the release of The Mask of Deception. The subsequent episodes were released throughout April and May 2018, with the season finale titled Big Trouble, Little Ninjago being released on 25 May of the same year.

Plot 
The Sons of Garmadon, a criminal biker gang, steals the Oni Mask of Vengeance. The ninja are summoned by the Royal Family, who ask them to protect the Oni Mask of Deception. There they meet Princess Harumi. At night, Lloyd follows a figure out of the palace and discovers that it is Harumi. They hand out food to children and Lloyd develops feelings for the princess. The Sons of Garmadon attack the Royal Palace and Lloyd escapes with Harumi on a motorbike. They survive, but lose the Oni mask. Lloyd, Jay, Zane and Cole visit Mistaké's Tea Shop. She relates the "Tale of the Oni and the Dragon", while Cole and Zane head to the police station. Mistaké tells Lloyd that the Sons of Garmadon want to use the three Oni Masks to resurrect Lord Garmadon in a purely evil form. At the police station, Zane and Cole trick Luke Cunningham into revealing the hangout of the biker gang. They go to Laughy's in disguise, and when Cole's cover is blown he is taken prisoner, but Zane is recruited as "Snake Jaguar". They force Zane to take part in a motorbike race, but a phone call from "The Quiet One", the gang's leader, reveals that Zane is a spy. Zane is forced to fight Mr. E, who reveals himself to be a Nindroid, knocks Zane off a cliff, and nearly destroys him. Cole escapes from his cell at the gang's base and finds a baby, who he takes with him.

The ninja find Zane and reboot his systems, unaware that Mr. E has planted a mechanical spider on him that sabotages the Bounty and P.I.X.A.L. While caring for the baby, the ninja discover the location of the Mask of Hatred. When the Samurai Mech captures Harumi, Lloyd jumps onto it and they plummet to the ground. Nya uses rain to slow the descent of the Bounty and they crash into the jungle. The ninja notice that the baby is now a toddler and realise that he is Wu. P.I.X.A.L. discovers that the signal from The Quiet One came from the Bounty, proving that the leader is Harumi. The ninja are captured by the Sons of Garmadon, while Lloyd and Harumi locate the Oni Temple. Lloyd realises that Harumi is The Quiet One and they fight over the mask, but Harumi escapes. The Sons of Garmadon leave with the three Oni Masks and Destiny's Bounty.

The Sons of Garmadon take Lloyd and Misako to the Temple of Resurrection and lock them in cells. Harumi performs the ritual that resurrects Lord Garmadon. The ninja manage to stop the ritual and the police arrest the gang. Back at the temple, it is revealed that the ritual did in fact work and Garmadon is resurrected. He frees Harumi and they go to Kryptarium Prison to release the prisoners. Lloyd confronts his father alone and they engage in a brutal fight which nearly kills Lloyd. Garmadon conquers Ninjago by creating a stone Colossus. Lloyd wakes up and discovers that his elemental powers have gone. He takes Wu and flees with Harumi in pursuit. Lloyd throws Wu to the ninja on board Destiny's Bounty, but it is too far for him to jump. The Colossus grabs the Bounty and crushes it, but before it is destroyed, the ninja use Traveller's Tea to escape, and they find themselves in the Realm of Oni and Dragons. Lloyd and Nya mourn their loss and go into hiding, unaware that the others have survived.

Episodes

Ratings 
The season premier of Sons of Garmadon aired on 16 April 2018 and achieved a position of 109 in the Top 150 Original Cable Telecasts with 0.50 million viewers.

Other media 
The season was accompanied by a related riding game titled Ride Ninja, which was released for Android and iOS. It was developed by Amuzo Games and published by The Lego Group.

References

Primary

Secondary 

Sons of Garmadon
2018 Canadian television seasons
2018 Danish television seasons